Ariyur is a village in K.Paramathy block, Karur district in the Indian state of Tamil Nadu.

Ariyur Pin code is 639111 and postal head office is Paramathi (Karur) .

Thumbivadi (7 km), Molapalayam (8 km), Karudayampalayam (8 km), Nagamballi (9 km), Gudalur East (9 km) are the nearby villages to Ariyur. Ariyur is surrounded by Aravakurichi Taluk to the south, Karur Taluk to the east, Kodumudi Taluk to the north, Thanthoni Taluk to the east.

Nearby cities 
Karur, Vellakoil, Punjaipugalur, Namakkal are the nearby cities to Ariyur.

Demographics
 India census, 
This place is in the border of the Karur District and Erode District. Erode District Kodumudi is North towards this place.

Transport
Karur Junction is major railway station  from Ariyur.

References

Villages in Karur district